Sir Stuart Alexander Donaldson (16 December 1812 – 11 January 1867) was the first Premier of the Colony of New South Wales.

Early life
Donaldson was born in London, England. He entered his father's firm at the age of 15 and was sent first to Mexico (1831-1834), for business training. After returning to England in May 1834, Donaldson travelled to Sydney, New South Wales, aboard the Emma Eugenia where he arrived on 5 May 1835. He returned to London between 1841 and 1844.

Career
In 1848, Donaldson was elected a member of the original unicameral Legislative Council of New South Wales, representing the County of Durham from February 1848 to January 1853. Comments made while running for re-election in 1851, led Sir Thomas Mitchell to demand a public apology. While Donaldson complied Mitchell was not satisfied and challenged Donaldson to a duel with pistols. Both men missed but they remained antagonised. He supported the development of steam ship services to Australia and the work of Caroline Chisholm. In 1852 he achieved the carriage of a motion recommending that £10,000 should be applied to supporting Chisholm's work. He travelled to England in 1853–1854.

From 1 February 1855 to 29 February 1856, Donaldson represented Sydney Hamlets in the council.
In March 1856, Donaldson was elected to the newly created Legislative Assembly of the first Parliament, representing Sydney Hamlets. The first Legislative Assembly had trouble forming a Government. Eventually Governor Denison invited Donaldson to be Premier and he took up the offices of Premier and Colonial Secretary on 6 June 1856. Two months and 20 days later, on 25 August 1856, his Government lost a vote and he resigned. He was criticised for standing down so readily but he said, "my colleagues and myself are all too independent of office to cling to it", a somewhat prophetic remark.

Donaldson was succeeded as Premier by Charles Cowper and Donaldson served as Colonial Treasurer (1856-1857) and was a Commissioner for Railways in 1857. He was elected unopposed to Cumberland (South Riding) in October 1856, representing it to 1859. He was a member of the Senate of the University of Sydney from 1851 to 1861 and his brother John helped to select its academic staff.

Late life
Donaldson returned to England for the last time in June 1859 and was knighted there in 1860. Following his return, he unsuccessfully sought election to the British House of Commons for Dartmouth in 1860 and later for Barnstaple. He had four sons and one daughter. The eldest son Stuart Alexander Donaldson, a distinguished scholar, became Master of Magdalene College, Cambridge, Vice-chancellor of the University of Cambridge in 1912 and died in 1915; another son was St Clair Donaldson – archbishop of Brisbane. A third son, Sir Hay Frederick Donaldson, who became an eminent engineer, went with Lord Kitchener on a special mission to Russia in 1916 and died when their ship, struck a German mine off the Orkney Islands.

Stuart Donaldson died at Carleton Hall, near Penrith in Cumberland, England on 11 January 1867.

See also
Tenterfield, New South Wales
Donaldson ministry

References

 

1812 births
1867 deaths
Australian pastoralists
Premiers of New South Wales
Members of the New South Wales Legislative Council
Members of the New South Wales Legislative Assembly
Australian Knights Bachelor
Businesspeople from London
English people of Scottish descent
Treasurers of New South Wales
Colonial Secretaries of New South Wales
19th-century Australian politicians
Australian people in whaling
Australian ship owners
British emigrants to Australia
19th-century English businesspeople
19th-century Australian businesspeople